There are about 420 known moth species of Equatorial Guinea. The moths (mostly nocturnal) and butterflies (mostly diurnal) together make up the taxonomic order Lepidoptera.

This is a list of moth species which have been recorded in Equatorial Guinea.

Alucitidae
Alucita plumigera (Strand, 1913)

Anomoeotidae
Anomoeotes leucolena Holland, 1893
Anomoeotes separatula Strand, 1913
Anomoeotes tenellula Holland, 1893
Staphylinochrous heringi Alberti, 1954

Arctiidae
Afraloa bifurca (Walker, 1855)
Afrasura indecisa (Walker, 1869)
Alpenus maculosa (Stoll, 1781)
Amerila nigroapicalis (Aurivillius, 1900)
Amerila vidua (Cramer, 1780)
Anapisa connexa (Walker, 1854)
Archilema uelleburgensis (Strand, 1912)
Archithosia costimacula (Mabille, 1878)
Archithosia flavifrontella (Strand, 1912)
Archithosia makomensis (Strand, 1912)
Asura craigii (Holland, 1893)
Balacra elegans Aurivillius, 1892
Balacra flavimacula Walker, 1856
Balacra preussi (Aurivillius, 1904)
Balacra pulchra Aurivillius, 1892
Balacra rubricincta Holland, 1893
Ceryx albimacula (Walker, 1854)
Cragia distigmata (Hampson, 1901)
Cyana flammeostrigata Karisch, 2003
Cyana heidrunae (Hoppe, 2004)
Cyana torrida (Holland, 1893)
Dubatolovia neurophaea (Hampson, 1911)
Epilacydes simulans Butler, 1875
Euchromia guineensis (Fabricius, 1775)
Euchromia lethe (Fabricius, 1775)
Kiriakoffalia guineae (Strand, 1912)
Metarctia benitensis Holland, 1893
Nacliodes microsippia Strand, 1912
Nanna eningae (Plötz, 1880)
Neuroxena fulleri (Druce, 1883)
Nyctemera acraeina Druce, 1882
Nyctemera apicalis (Walker, 1854)
Nyctemera chromis Druce, 1882
Nyctemera perspicua (Walker, 1854)
Ovenna guineacola (Strand, 1912)
Ovenna subgriseola (Strand, 1912)
Pseudothyretes nigrita (Kiriakoff, 1961)
Pseudothyretes rubicundula (Strand, 1912)
Pusiola celida (Bethune-Baker, 1911)
Radiarctia lutescens (Walker, 1854)
Rhipidarctia flaviceps (Hampson, 1898)
Spilosoma aurantiaca (Holland, 1893)
Spilosoma rava (Druce, 1898)
Spilosoma togoensis Bartel, 1903
Tesma nigrapex (Strand, 1912)

Brahmaeidae
Dactyloceras canui Bouyer, 2002

Choreutidae
Brenthia octogemmifera Walsingham, 1897

Copromorphidae
Rhynchoferella hoppei Mey, 2007

Cossidae
Eulophonotus elegans (Aurivillius, 1910)
Holcoceroides ferrugineotincta Strand, 1913
Oreocossus occidentalis Strand, 1913

Crambidae
Aethaloessa floridalis (Zeller, 1852)
Argyractis limalis Viette, 1957
Botyodes asialis Guenée, 1854
Bradina sordidalis (Dewitz, 1881)
Cadarena sinuata (Fabricius, 1781)
Chilo aleniella (Strand, 1913)
Cnaphalocrocis poeyalis (Boisduval, 1833)
Cotachena smaragdina (Butler, 1875)
Eoophyla alba Mey, 2009
Eporidia dariusalis Walker, 1859
Glyphandra biincisalis Karsch, 1900
Hymenia perspectalis (Hübner, 1796)
Metoeca foedalis (Guenée, 1854)
Orphanostigma abruptalis (Walker, 1859)
Orphanostigma fervidalis (Zeller, 1852)
Orphanostigma latimarginalis (Walker, 1859)
Pardomima distortana (Strand, 1913)
Phostria erebusalis (Hampson, 1898)
Pyrausta sexplagialis Gaede, 1917
Spoladea recurvalis (Fabricius, 1775)
Synclera traducalis (Zeller, 1852)
Ulopeza alenialis Strand, 1913
Ulopeza conigeralis Zeller, 1852
Ulopeza panaresalis (Walker, 1859)
Zebronia phenice (Cramer, 1780)

Drepanidae
Epicampoptera difficilis Hering, 1934

Elachistidae
Cryptolechia viridisignata (Strand, 1913)

Eupterotidae
Epijana cinerea Holland, 1893
Epijana cosima (Plötz, 1880)
Janomima dannfelti (Aurivillius, 1893)
Stenoglene sulphureotinctus Strand, 1912

Gelechiidae
Brachmia ditemenitis Meyrick, 1934
Ptilothyris purpurea Walsingham, 1897

Geometridae
Aletis helcita (Linnaeus, 1763)
Asthenotricha amblycoma Prout, 1935
Asthenotricha fernandi Prout, 1935
Bathycolpodes semigrisea (Warren, 1897)
Biston abruptaria (Walker, 1869)
Biston johannaria (Oberthür, 1913)
Braueriana karischi Herbulot, 1996
Chlorodrepana inaequisecta Herbulot, 1999
Cleora herbuloti D. S. Fletcher, 1967
Cleora pavlitzkiae (D. S. Fletcher, 1958)
Collix biokensis Herbulot, 1999
Collix brevipalpis Herbulot, 1999
Colocleora smithi (Warren, 1904)
Comibaena barnsi Prout, 1930
Conolophia persimilis (Warren, 1905)
Derambila punctisignata Walker, 1863
Dioptrochasma ablegata Herbulot, 1996
Dioptrochasma calderae Herbulot, 1996
Dioptrochasma mercyi Herbulot, 1956
Ecpetala camerunica Herbulot, 1988
Eois alticola (Aurivillius, 1925)
Epigynopteryx tabitha Warren, 1901
Epigynopteryx termininota Prout, 1934
Erastria albosignata (Walker, 1863)
Ereunetea minor (Holland, 1893)
Eupithecia calderae Herbulot, 1999
Eupithecia fernandi Herbulot, 1999
Eupithecia jeanneli Herbulot, 1953
Eupithecia karischi Herbulot, 1999
Eupithecia nigribasis (Warren, 1902)
Hypochrosis banakaria (Plötz, 1880)
Hypocoela turpisaria (Swinhoe, 1904)
Hypomecis nessa Herbulot, 1995
Hypomecis quaerenda Herbulot, 2000
Idaea pulveraria (Snellen, 1872)
Idiodes pectinata (Herbulot, 1966)
Megadrepana cinerea Holland, 1893
Melinoessa aemonia (Swinhoe, 1904)
Melinoessa amplissimata (Walker, 1863)
Melinoessa asteria Prout, 1934
Melinoessa croesaria Herrich-Schäffer, 1855
Menophra bilobata Herbulot, 1995
Menophra nathaliae Herbulot, 1998
Mimaletis postica (Walker, 1869)
Narthecusa tenuiorata Walker, 1862
Piercia ansorgei (Bethune-Baker, 1913)
Pingasa dispensata (Walker, 1860)
Pitthea agenoria Druce, 1890
Plegapteryx anomalus Herrich-Schäffer, 1856
Racotis angulosa Herbulot, 1973
Racotis zebrina Warren, 1899
Ramopteryx viridimista Karisch, 2001
Scopula acidalia (Holland, 1894)
Scopula anoista (Prout, 1915)
Scopula conspicillaria Karisch, 2001
Scopula ectopostigma Prout, 1932
Scopula herbuloti Karisch, 2001
Scopula karischi Herbulot, 1999
Scopula laevipennis (Warren, 1897)
Scopula obliquifascia Herbulot, 1999
Scopula pyraliata (Warren, 1898)
Scopula rectisecta Prout, 1920
Scopula recurvata Herbulot, 1992
Scopula sordaria Karisch, 2001
Scopula suda Prout, 1932
Scopula valentinella Karisch, 2001
Terina circumdata Walker, 1865
Terina doleris (Plötz, 1880)
Thalassodes dentatilinea Prout, 1912
Victoria perornata Warren, 1898
Xanthisthisa extrema Herbulot, 1999
Xanthorhoe ansorgei (Warren, 1899)
Xanthorhoe heliopharia (Swinhoe, 1904)
Xanthorhoe tamsi D. S. Fletcher, 1963
Xenimpia karischi Herbulot, 1996
Xenostega tincta Warren, 1899
Xylopteryx dargei Herbulot, 1984
Xylopteryx elongata Herbulot, 1984
Zamarada aurolineata Gaede, 1915
Zamarada bicuspida D. S. Fletcher, 1974
Zamarada dentigera Warren, 1909
Zamarada griseola D. S. Fletcher, 1974
Zamarada ixiaria Swinhoe, 1904
Zamarada melpomene Oberthür, 1912
Zamarada paxilla D. S. Fletcher, 1974
Zamarada platycephala D. S. Fletcher, 1974

Hyblaeidae
Hyblaea occidentalium Holland, 1894

Lasiocampidae
Braura ligniclusa (Walker, 1865)
Braura truncatum (Walker, 1855)
Catalebeda cuneilinea (Walker, 1856)
Catalebeda discocellularis Strand, 1912
Cheligium nigrescens (Aurivillius, 1909)
Chrysopsyche antennifera Strand, 1912
Eucraera koellikerii (Dewitz, 1881)
Filiola occidentale (Strand, 1912)
Gelo anastella Zolotuhin & Prozorov, 2010
Gonobombyx angulata Aurivillius, 1893
Gonometa nysa Druce, 1887
Lechriolepis nigrivenis Strand, 1912
Lechriolepis rotunda Strand, 1912
Lechriolepis tessmanni Strand, 1912
Leipoxais makomona Strand, 1912
Leipoxais marginepunctata Holland, 1893
Leipoxais peraffinis Holland, 1893
Leipoxais proboscidea (Guérin-Méneville, 1832)
Leipoxais regularis Strand, 1912
Leipoxais rufobrunnea Strand, 1912
Leipoxais siccifolia Aurivillius, 1902
Mallocampa alenica Strand, 1912
Mallocampa audea (Druce, 1887)
Mallocampa punctilimbata Strand, 1912
Mimopacha brunnea Hering, 1941
Mimopacha gerstaeckerii (Dewitz, 1881)
Mimopacha knoblauchii (Dewitz, 1881)
Odontocheilopteryx maculata Aurivillius, 1905
Odontocheilopteryx phoneus Hering, 1928
Odontocheilopteryx pica Gurkovich & Zolotuhin, 2009
Pachymetana custodita (Strand, 1912)
Pachymetoides stigmatica (Strand, 1911)
Pachyna subfascia (Walker, 1855)
Pachytrina honrathii (Dewitz, 1881)
Pallastica meloui (Riel, 1909)
Philotherma spargata (Holland, 1893)
Pseudometa concava (Strand, 1912)
Pseudometa punctipennis (Strand, 1912)
Stoermeriana makomanum (Strand, 1912)
Stoermeriana tessmanni (Strand, 1912)
Streblote guineanum (Strand, 1912)
Streblote splendens (Druce, 1887)
Trabala aethiopica (Strand, 1912)
Trabala burchardi (Dewitz, 1881)

Limacodidae
Andaingo bicolor (Strand, 1913)
Anilina plebeia (Karsch, 1899)
Baria elsa (Druce, 1887)
Casphalia extranea (Walker, 1869)
Casphalia nigerrima Holland, 1893
Compactena hilda (Druce, 1887)
Compactena secta (Strand, 1913)
Cosuma rugosa Walker, 1855
Ctenolita anacompa Karsch, 1896
Ctenolita argyrobapta Karsch, 1899
Ctenolita epargyra Karsch, 1896
Hadraphe aprica Karsch, 1899
Latoia phlebodes (Karsch, 1896)
Latoia urda (Druce, 1887)
Latoiola albipuncta (Holland, 1893)
Niphadolepis argenteobrunnea Strand, 1913
Niphadolepis quinquestrigata Strand, 1913
Parasa trapezoidea Aurivillius, 1900
Perola secunda (Strand, 1913)
Phorma pepon Karsch, 1896
Prolatoia sjostedti (Aurivillius, 1897)
Stroteroides nigrisignata Strand, 1913
Tryphax uelleburgensis Strand, 1913

Lymantriidae
Argyrostagma niobe (Weymer, 1896)
Barobata trocta Karsch, 1895
Batella muscosa (Holland, 1893)
Conigephyra citrona (Hering, 1926)
Dasychira achatina Hering, 1926
Dasychira albosignata Holland, 1893
Dasychira allotria Hering, 1926
Dasychira chlorobasis Hering, 1926
Dasychira gloveroides Hering, 1926
Dasychira goodii (Holland, 1893)
Dasychira laeliopsis Hering, 1926
Dasychira perfida (Bethune-Baker, 1911)
Dasychira sagittiphora Hering, 1926
Dasychira sphalera Hering, 1926
Dasychira strigidentata Bethune-Baker, 1911
Euproctilla tesselata (Holland, 1893)
Euproctis apicipuncta (Holland, 1893)
Euproctis crocata (Boisduval, 1847)
Euproctis neavei Tams, 1924
Euproctis parallela (Holland, 1893)
Euproctis reutlingeri Holland, 1893
Euproctis tessmanni Hering, 1926
Hemerophanes diatoma (Hering, 1926)
Hemerophanes enos (Druce, 1896)
Laelia lignicolor Holland, 1893
Laelia mediofasciata (Hering, 1926)
Laelia pulcherrima (Hering, 1926)
Laelia thanatos (Hering, 1926)
Leucoma luteipes (Walker, 1855)
Leucoma melanochila (Hering, 1926)
Leucoperina atroguttata Aurivillius, 1909
Lymantria vacillans Walker, 1855
Marbla divisa (Walker, 1855)
Mylantria xanthospila (Plötz, 1880)
Neomardara africana (Holland, 1893)
Olene basalis (Walker, 1855)
Otroeda hesperia (Cramer, 1779)
Paramarbla azami (Kheil, 1909)
Terphothrix lanaria Holland, 1893
Viridichira cameruna (Aurivillius, 1904)
Viridichira longistriata (Hering, 1926)

Metarbelidae
Metarbela pygatula Strand, 1913
Metarbela quadriguttata Aurivillius, 1925
Metarbela reticulosana Strand, 1913
Metarbela stivafer Holland, 1893

Noctuidae
Achaea ezea (Cramer, 1779)
Amazonides aleuca Prout
Anticarsia rubricans (Boisduval, 1833)
Asota speciosa (Drury, 1773)
Brithys crini (Fabricius, 1775)
Callopistria maillardi (Guenée, 1862)
Callyna decora Walker, 1858
Carpostalagma viridis (Plötz, 1880)
Condica conducta (Walker, 1857)
Cyligramma limacina (Guérin-Méneville, 1832)
Dysgonia torrida (Guenée, 1852)
Eudocima divitiosa (Walker, 1869)
Feliniopsis africana (Schaus & Clements, 1893)
Feliniopsis annosa (Viette, 1963)
Feliniopsis baueri Hacker & Fibiger, 2007
Feliniopsis connivens (Felder & Rogenhofer, 1874)
Feliniopsis duponti (Laporte, 1974)
Feliniopsis ivoriensis (Laporte, 1973)
Feliniopsis karischi Hacker & Fibiger, 2007
Feliniopsis kobesi Hacker & Fibiger, 2007
Feliniopsis laportei Hacker & Fibiger, 2007
Feliniopsis ligniensis (Laporte, 1973)
Feliniopsis nigribarbata (Hampson, 1908)
Feliniopsis parvula Hacker & Fibiger, 2007
Godasa sidae (Fabricius, 1793)
Heliophisma catocalina Holland, 1894
Heraclia geryon (Fabricius, 1781)
Heraclia poggei (Dewitz, 1879)
Hypena obacerralis Walker, [1859]
Hypocala dysdamarta A. E. Prout, 1927
Hypopyra capensis Herrich-Schäffer, 1854
Mocis frugalis (Fabricius, 1775)
Mocis undata (Fabricius, 1775)
Parachalciope benitensis (Holland, 1894)
Parachalciope euclidicola (Walker, 1858)
Pseudoarcte melanis (Mabille, 1890)
Rhanidophora aethiops (Grünberg, 1907)
Soloe trigutta Walker, 1854
Soloella guttivaga (Walker, 1854)
Spodoptera littoralis (Boisduval, 1833)
Thyas parallelipipeda (Guenée, 1852)

Nolidae
Aiteta escalerai Kheil, 1909

Notodontidae
Desmeocraera latifasciata Gaede, 1928
Desmeocraerula inconspicuana Strand, 1912
Galanthella arctipennis (Holland, 1893)
Gargettoscrancia albolineata (Strand, 1912)
Peratodonta brunnea Aurivillius, 1904
Peratodonta olivacea Gaede, 1928
Phalera atrata (Grünberg, 1907)
Scalmicauda brevipennis (Holland, 1893)
Scalmicauda tessmanni (Strand, 1911)

Oecophoridae
Eucleodora plumbipictella Strand, 1913
Oedematopoda bicoloricornis Strand, 1913

Psychidae
Clania guineensis Strand, 1913
Eumeta cervina Druce, 1887
Eumeta strandi Bourgogne, 1955
Monda stupida Strand, 1913

Pterophoridae
Megalorhipida leucodactylus (Fabricius, 1794)
Oxyptilus tessmanni Strand, 1913
Platyptilia benitensis Strand, 1913
Platyptilia molopias Meyrick, 1906
Platyptilia pygmaeana Strand, 1913
Platyptiliodes albisignatula (Strand, 1913)
Pterophorus virgo (Strand, 1913)
Sphenarches anisodactylus (Walker, 1864)

Pyralidae
Eldana saccharina Walker, 1865
Sabormania pia Strand, 1913

Saturniidae
Bunaeopsis hersilia (Westwood, 1849)
Goodia hierax Jordan, 1922
Goodia obscuripennis Strand, 1912
Holocerina angulata (Aurivillius, 1893)
Imbrasia obscura (Butler, 1878)
Lobobunaea phaedusa (Drury, 1782)
Ludia delegorguei (Boisduval, 1847)
Ludia tessmanni Strand, 1911
Micragone lichenodes (Holland, 1893)
Orthogonioptilum adiegetum Karsch, 1892
Pselaphelia gemmifera (Butler, 1878)
Pseudantheraea discrepans (Butler, 1878)

Sesiidae
Adixoana auripyga Strand, 1913
Aegeria alenicum (Strand, 1913)
Chamanthedon brillians (Beutenmüller, 1899)
Conopia alenicola (Strand, 1913)
Conopia guineabia (Strand, 1913)
Macrotarsipus africanus (Beutenmüller, 1899)
Melittia oedipus Oberthür, 1878
Vespaegeria typica Strand, 1913

Sphingidae
Falcatula falcata (Rothschild & Jordan, 1903)
Neopolyptychus prionites (Rothschild & Jordan, 1916)
Polyptychoides digitatus (Karsch, 1891)
Pseudoclanis rhadamistus (Fabricius, 1781)
Temnora livida (Holland, 1889)

Thyrididae
Byblisia setipes (Plötz, 1880)
Heteroschista nigranalis Warren, 1903
Marmax hyparchus (Cramer, 1779)
Nemea eugrapha (Hampson, 1906)
Nemea tamsi Whalley, 1971
Ninia plumipes (Drury, 1782)
Rhodoneura sordidula (Plötz, 1880)
Striglina rothi Warren, 1898
Striglina strigifera (Strand, 1913)
Symphleps signicostata (Strand, 1913)
Trichobaptes auristrigata (Plötz, 1880)

Tortricidae
Cnephasia quentini Karisch, 2008
Enarmoniodes praetextana (Walsingham, 1897)
Goniotorna valentini Karisch, 2008
Idiothauma africanum Walsingham, 1897
Lozotaenia basilea Karisch, 2008
Mictocommosis argus (Walsingham, 1897)
Pandemis isotetras (Meyrick, 1934)
Sanguinograptis albardana (Snellen, 1872)
Tortrix benitonensis Strand, 1913
Xenosocia oreomontana Karisch, 2008

Uraniidae
Aploschema albaria (Plötz, 1880)
Dissoprumna erycinaria (Guenée, 1857)

Xyloryctidae
Eretmocera alenica Strand, 1913
Eretmocera benitonis Strand, 1913
Eretmocera pachypennis Strand, 1913

Zygaenidae
Metanycles sachtlebeni Alberti, 1954
Saliunca aurifrons Walker, 1864
Saliunca flavifrons (Plötz, 1880)
Saliunca mimetica Jordan, 1907
Saliunca nkolentangensis Strand, 1913
Saliunca solora (Plötz, 1880)
Saliunca styx (Fabricius, 1775)

References

External links 

Equatorial Guinea
Equatorial Guinea
Moths